Lysimache (Ancient Greek: Λυσιμάχη Lusimákhē) is the name of two characters in Greek mythology:

Lysimache, daughter of Abas, son of Melampus. She married king Talaus of Argos and bore him these children: Adrastus, Mecisteus, Hippomedon, Pronax, Aristomachus, and Eriphyle.
Lysimache, a daughter of Priam, king of Troy.

Notes

Reference 

 Apollodorus, The Library with an English Translation by Sir James George Frazer, F.B.A., F.R.S. in 2 Volumes, Cambridge, MA, Harvard University Press; London, William Heinemann Ltd. 1921. ISBN 0-674-99135-4. Online version at the Perseus Digital Library. Greek text available from the same website.

Princesses in Greek mythology
Children of Priam
Women of the Trojan war
Trojans
Argive characters in Greek mythology